Geoff Southby (born 27 October 1950) is a former Australian rules footballer in the (then) Victorian Football League (VFL).

An attacking full-back who ran hard from defence and stopped the best full-forwards, Southby was a key contributor to Carlton Football Club's success in the 1970s.

In 2000, Southby was inducted into the Australian Football Hall of Fame. Southby was also inducted into the Carlton Football Club Hall of Fame, and he was elevated to Legend status in 2013.

References 

 Geoff Southby at Blueseum.org.
 AFL: Hall of Fame

All-Australians (1953–1988)
Australian Football Hall of Fame inductees
Carlton Football Club players
Carlton Football Club Premiership players
John Nicholls Medal winners
Victorian State of Origin players
Sandhurst Football Club players
Australian rules footballers from Bendigo
1950 births
Living people
Two-time VFL/AFL Premiership players